Plateau's laws describe the structure of soap films. These laws were formulated in the 19th century by the Belgian physicist Joseph Plateau from his experimental observations. Many patterns in nature are based on foams obeying these laws.

Laws for soap films

Plateau's laws describe the shape and configuration of soap films as follows:

 Soap films are made of entire (unbroken) smooth surfaces.
 The mean curvature of a portion of a soap film is everywhere constant on any point on the same piece of soap film.
 Soap films always meet in threes along an edge called a Plateau border, and they do so at an angle of arccos(−) = 120°.
 These Plateau borders meet in fours at a vertex, at the tetrahedral angle of arccos(−) ≈ 109.47°.

Configurations other than those of Plateau's laws are unstable, and the film will quickly tend to rearrange itself to conform to these laws.

That these laws hold for minimal surfaces was proved mathematically by Jean Taylor using geometric measure theory.

See also

 Young–Laplace equation, governing the curvature of surfaces in a soap film

Notes

Sources

External links

 

Minimal surfaces